Rock'n Roll Duds (subtitled The Best of the B Sides) is the first compilation album by Australian indie rock band The Cruel Sea. The album was released in November 1995 and peaked at number 40 on the ARIA Charts.

Reception
The Canberra Times said, "If there was ever any doubt that The Cruel Sea is not just very cool, but also very "musically sound", then this collection of B-sides will erase it. The album is loosely-formatted, and a bit tongue-in-cheek. What it lacks by way of polished production it makes up for with bump and-grind blues and camp fire music."

Track listing

Charts

Release history

References

1995 compilation albums
The Cruel Sea (band) albums
Albums produced by Tony Cohen
Compilation albums by Australian artists